Margrét Lára Viðarsdóttir (born 25 July 1986) is an Icelandic former footballer who played in the striker position. She is the all-time top goalscorer of the Iceland national team and competed for her country at the UEFA Women's Championships in 2009 and 2013. In a club career sometimes disrupted by injury, Margrét Lára represented ÍBV and Valur of the Icelandic Úrvalsdeild, Duisburg and Turbine Potsdam of the Frauen-Bundesliga, and Linköpings and Kristianstads DFF of the Damallsvenskan.

Margrét Lára is the elder sister of Elísa Viðarsdóttir, who also played for Iceland's national team.

Early life
Margrét Lára was born in Vestmannaeyjar, Iceland to Viðar Elíasson and his wife Guðmunda Bjarnadóttir. Viðar had played football for ÍBV and later became chairman of the club. As well as Margrét Lára, both her brothers Bjarni Geir Viðarsson and Sindri Viðarsson played football for ÍBV, as did her only sister Elísa.

Club career
Making her Úrvalsdeild kvenna debut as a 15-year-old, Margrét Lára developed into a prolific striker at ÍBV. In 2004, she switched to rivals Valur of Reykjavík and continued to score regularly. She won a league and cup double with Valur in 2006.

Margrét Lára's goalscoring record in Iceland meant that several leading clubs in Europe and America pursued her transfer. The Germans FCR 2001 Duisburg won the race for her signature and in October 2006 she scored twice in Duisburg's 3–2 win at holders Turbine Potsdam in the Frauen DFB Pokal. Margrét Lára failed to settle in Germany and returned to Valur in January 2007, citing homesickness.

A record-breaking season in 2007 saw Margrét Lára hit 38 goals in 16 league matches for Valur. She was also named Iceland's Sports Personality of the Year, ahead of the male footballer Eiður Guðjohnsen. As well as her scoring feats at domestic level, she thrived in the UEFA Women's Cup, finishing as overall top goalscorer in 2005–06, 2007–08 and 2008–09.

In the 2008 WPS International Draft, Margrét Lára was selected by the Los Angeles Sol but decided not to join the Women's Professional Soccer team. Instead she moved to Sweden and signed for Linköpings FC, remarking: "I will absolutely try to play in USA [sic] some time, but where I am career wise right now it feels better to play in Sweden."

At Linköpings Margrét Lára struggled to replicate her earlier form and started four of her 12 matches in the first half of the season, scoring twice. She wanted more playing time ahead of the 2009 European Championships so moved to Kristianstads DFF during the mid-season break. Although Kristianstads were a lower ranked team, she was happy to move in order to reunite with Elísabet Gunnarsdóttir – who had been her coach at Valur.

She won the Damallsvenskan top scorer award in 2011, tied at 16 goals with Manon Melis of LdB FC Malmö. In October 2011 she signed for German champions Turbine Potsdam. Transferring outside the transfer window meant she was ineligible for league and Champions League matches until 1 January 2012.

A persistent hamstring injury marred Margrét Lára's second spell in German football. After scoring one league goal she was allowed to rejoin Kristianstads at the end of the season.

In September 2012 a Norwegian doctor diagnosed Margrét Lára's longstanding thigh injury as compartment syndrome. She immediately scheduled surgery to fix the issue which had inhibited her training for several seasons and caused her to operate at 70% of her true level.

Before the 2013 Damallsvenskan season, Kristianstads gave a trial to Margrét Lára's visiting sister Elísa in a pre-season friendly, but had no immediate plans to sign the younger Viðarsdóttir to a contract. Margrét Lára remained sidelined for several more weeks following her thigh operation. She scored 13 goals in 22 Damallsvenskan appearances in 2013, but announced her pregnancy in December which ruled her out of Kristianstads' 2014 campaign.

Following the birth of her first child, Margrét Lára returned to training with Kristianstads in December 2014. After playing in the 2015 Damallsvenskan season she made the decision to leave Kristianstads and returned to Iceland.

In November 2015, she completed her move back to Iceland by signing a two-year contract for a second spell with Valur. On 30 July 2019, she became the second player – after Olga Færseth – to score 200 goals in the Úrvalsdeild kvenna.

On 26 November 2019, Margrét Lára announced her retirement from football.

International career
Margrét Lára made her first appearance for the senior Iceland women's national football team on 14 June 2003, in a 2005 UEFA Women's Championship qualification match against Hungary at Laugardalsvöllur. She scored four minutes after entering play as a 66th-minute substitute in Iceland's 4–1 win.

In qualifying for UEFA Women's Euro 2009, Margrét Lára was the competition's top scorer with 12 goals. She scored the only goal in a home win over France as Iceland reached their first major international tournament at any level. At the final tournament in Finland, she played in all three group games as Iceland made a first round exit.

Four years later, national team coach Siggi Eyjólfsson selected Margrét Lára in the Iceland squad for UEFA Women's Euro 2013. She had contributed 11 goals during qualifying, including goals in both legs of the play-off win over Ukraine.

In Iceland's opening match in Kalmar, Margrét Lára struck a late penalty to secure a 1–1 draw with Norway which gave Iceland their first ever point in a European Championship finals. It was her 70th goal in her 89th cap. The team qualified for the quarter-finals, where they were beaten 4–0 by hosts Sweden.

With Margrét Lára on maternity leave, incoming national coach Freyr Alexandersson appointed Sara Björk Gunnarsdóttir as the new team captain in 2014. After the birth of her first child Margrét Lára was swiftly recalled to Iceland's squad for the 2015 Algarve Cup.

Her last international game came on 8 October 2019 where she scored one goal in Iceland's 6–0 victory against Latvia.

Career statistics

Scores and results list Iceland's goal tally first, score column indicates score after each Margrét Lára goal.

Honours
Valur
 Úrvalsdeild kvenna: 2006, 2007, 2008, 2019
 Icelandic Women's Cup: 2006

Individual
 Úrvalsdeild kvenna top scorer: 2004, 2005, 2006, 2007, 2008
 Damallsvenskan top scorer: 2011
 UEFA Women's Champions League top scorer: 2006, 2008, 2009

References

External links

 
 
 
 
 
 
 

1986 births
Living people
Margret Lara Vidarsdottir
Margret Lara Vidarsdottir
Margret Lara Vidarsdottir
Margret Lara Vidarsdottir
Expatriate women's footballers in Germany
Margret Lara Vidarsdottir
1. FFC Turbine Potsdam players
FCR 2001 Duisburg players
Kristianstads DFF players
Linköpings FC players
Damallsvenskan players
Expatriate women's footballers in Sweden
Margret Lara Vidarsdottir
FIFA Century Club
Margret Lara Vidarsdottir
Margret Lara Vidarsdottir
Women's association football forwards
Margret Lara Vidarsdottir